Route 590 is an  long north–south secondary highway in the eastern portion of New Brunswick, Canada.

The route starts at Route 130 north of Waterville east of Exit 172 of the Trans Canada Highway. The road travels south through Waterville and Lower Waterville, along a former Trans-Canada alignment, before continuing southeast through a mostly agricultural area to end at Route 560 in Jacksonville.

History

See also

References

590
590